In enzymology, a diphosphate-purine nucleoside kinase is an enzyme that catalyzes the chemical reaction

diphosphate + a purine nucleoside  phosphate + a purine mononucleotide

Thus, the two substrates of this enzyme are diphosphate and purine nucleoside, whereas its two products are phosphate and purine mononucleotide.

This enzyme belongs to the family of transferases, specifically those transferring phosphorus-containing groups (phosphotransferases) with an alcohol group as acceptor.  The systematic name of this enzyme class is diphosphate:purine nucleoside phosphotransferase. This enzyme is also called pyrophosphate-purine nucleoside kinase.

References

 
 

EC 2.7.1
Enzymes of unknown structure